Itumba is an administrative ward in Ileje District, Songwe Region, Tanzania. According to the 2002 census, the ward has a total population of 12,668. It is home to the Ndali people, who occupy that region of Tanzania and parts of Malawi.

References

Wards of Songwe Region